Mohd Isam bin Mohd Isa is a Malaysian politician who is a member of the United Malays National Organisation (UMNO), a component party of the Barisan Nasional (BN) coalition. He has served as the Member of Parliament of Tampin since November 2022.

Early life and education

Mohd Isam was born in Gemencheh, Negeri Sembilan and grew up in the state for most of his life. He holds various certificate in civil engineering such as a diploma from Politeknik Port Dickson and a certificate from Politeknik Sultan Haji Ahmad Shah. He eventually continued his studies at the University of Technology Malaysia where he graduated with a bachelor's degree in engineering.

Political career
Mohd Isam is currently the Division Chief of UMNO Tampin. Before winning the Tampin parliamentary seat, Mohd Isam was the Member of the Negeri Sembilan State Legislative Assembly for Gemencheh.

Election results

Honours
  :
  Recipient of the Meritorious Service Medal (PJK) (2004)
  Member of the Order of Loyalty to Negeri Sembilan (ANS) (2010)
  Companion of the Order of Loyalty to Negeri Sembilan (DNS) (2015)
  Knight Commander of the Order of Loyalty to Negeri Sembilan (DPNS) – Dato' (2017)

References

Living people
Malaysian people of Malay descent
Malaysian Muslims
United Malays National Organisation politicians
21st-century Malaysian politicians
1969 births